Donskoye is a rural locality (a selo) in Tambovsky District of Tambov Oblast, Russia, located   northeast of Tambov.

Rural localities in Tambov Oblast